Maslovka is a rural locality (a selo) in Valuysky District, Belgorod Oblast, Russia. The population was 110 as of 2010. There are 2 streets.

Geography 
Nasonovo is located 15 km northeast of Valuyki (the district's administrative centre) by road. Borisovo is the nearest rural locality.

References 

Rural localities in Valuysky District